Pyar Hi Pyar ("Love, only love") is a 1969 Bollywood film produced by Rajaram and Satish Wagle, and directed by Bhappi Sonie. The film stars Dharmendra, Vyjayanthimala, Pran, Helen, Madan Puri and Mehmood. This was the only movie of Dharmendra and Vyjayanthimala together.

Plot
Vijay finds employment as a police inspector, much to his father Kailashnath's displeasure. Vijay's first assignment is to locate a beautiful young woman's missing father. Vijay falls head-over-heels in love with the young woman (Kavita). Vijay sets about to find her father. In the meantime another young man convinces Kailashnath that he is his real son and that Vijay is not who he claims to be.

Cast
 Dharmendra as Vijay Pratap Gupta
 Vyjayanthimala as Kavita
 Pran as Satish Raj / Ashok
 Mehmood as Gogo
 Helen as Cham Cham
 Madan Puri as Dindayal
 Dhumal as Jattadhari
 Raj Mehra as Kailashnath Gupta
 D. K. Sapru as Diwan
 Manmohan as Shyam Kumar
 Sulochana Latkar as Yashoda
 Sulochana Chatterjee as Laxmi
 Krishan Dhawan as Kewal Mehra
 Mehmood Jr. as Mehmood Ali
 Salim Khan as Drummer
 Shatrughan Sinha as Uncredited Villain
 Paro Devi as Savitri Devi
 Padmarani as Kavita's friend
 Sadhana Patel as Kavita's friend
 Yunus Bihari as Henchman
 Robert as Dancer in the song 'Tu Mera, main Teri.. '
 Moolchand as Masseur of Jataadhari

Soundtrack
The movie's songs were popular and were hits at that time. Mohammed Rafi sang for Dharmendra and Mehmood in the same film. "Agogo Ageya" was for Mehmood and the rest of the songs were for Dharmendra. "Mein Kahin Kavi" and "Dekha Hai Teri Aankhon Mein" of Mohammed Rafi were huge hits.

Salim Khan, father of Salman, was the drummer in the song "Tu Mera, Mein Teri" of Mohammed Rafi and Asha Bhosle picturized on Dharmendra and Vyjayanthimala.

Playback singer Mohammed Rafi sang all six songs in the movie. He playbacked for both Dharmendra and Mehmood. "Mein Kahin Kavi Na" was the most popular number of the movie and became a huge hit.

External links 
 

1969 films
1960s Hindi-language films
Films scored by Shankar–Jaikishan
Films directed by Bhappi Sonie